Defending champions Yui Kamiji and Jordanne Whiley defeated Jiske Griffioen and Aniek van Koot in the final, 6–2, 5–7, 6–3 to win the ladies' doubles wheelchair tennis title at the 2015 Wimbledon Championships.

Seeds

  Yui Kamiji /  Jordanne Whiley (champions)
   Jiske Griffioen /  Aniek van Koot (final)

Draw

Finals

References
Draw

Women's Wheelchair Doubles
Wimbledon Championship by year – Wheelchair women's doubles